2704 may refer to:

2704 Julian Loewe asteroid
Hirth 2704 two stroke aircraft engine
The year in the 28th century